Aloe ballyi (the "rat aloe") is a species of flowering plant in the family Asphodelaceae, native to Kenya and Tanzania.

Description
This species of Aloe forms tall, slender stems of up to 6 meters. The leaves are long, slender, and mostly straight - only recurving slightly towards the tips. Dead leaves do not long remain on the stem, unlike in the case of most aloes. Unlike most aloes, the "rat aloe" is poisonous.

The flowers are only mildly tubular, with their segments united for 1/3 of their length.

Distribution
It is native to the Eastern Arc Mountains and coastal forests of Kenya and Tanzania. This rare aloe grows in the bush with acacias and succulents.

References

ballyi
Flora of Kenya
Flora of Tanzania
Endangered flora of Africa
Taxonomy articles created by Polbot